Trachydactylus hajarensis, the spacious rock gecko or banded ground gecko, is a species of lizard in the family Gekkonidae. It is found in Oman and the United Arab Emirates.

References

Trachydactylus
Reptiles described in 1980